Beatle Barkers is a 1983 album released by the "Woofers & Tweeters Ensemble"  on the Passport Records label. The album consists of dogs barking a parody of popular Beatles songs.  The guitar and other instrumental tracks, performed by anonymous backing musicians from Germany, are very similar to the original Beatles recordings, with the animal sounds taking the place of the sung lyrics.  In addition to dogs, performances by other animals such as sheep, farmyard fowls and a cat are included. All the animal sounds were sampled from real animals except for the howling dogs which were recorded by a dog impersonator. In a review in The Boston Phoenix, the album was praised as a "real howler".

The album was a collaboration between engineer Roy Nicolson and producer Gene Pierson. Nicolson had begun experimenting with animal sounds on an E-mu Emulator I, an early sampler. Pierson jokingly asked him if he could play "Paperback Writer" using dogs barking. He did and soon Pierson had commissioned him to create the album, which was made in about two weeks on an 8-track tape machine, with two tracks for the backing tracks and six for the animals. The album was released on Passport Records and marketed by Demtel.

Track listing
All songs written by Lennon/McCartney.
"I Wanna Hold Your Hand"
"Love Me Do"
"Ob La Di Ob La Da"
"We Can Work It Out"
"I Saw Her Standing There"
"I Feel Fine"
"Can't Buy Me Love"
"All My Loving"
"Day Tripper"
"She Loves You"
"A Hard Day's Night"
"Paperback Writer"

References

1983 albums
Novelty albums
The Beatles tribute albums
Musical parodies
Passport Records albums
1980s comedy albums